Rhacostoma is a genus of aequoreid hydrozoans. It is monotypic with a single species, Rhacostoma atlanticum. It has been reported from the Atlantic coastline of North America, Colombia, western and central Africa. The polyp stage is unknown.

Morphology
Specimens found in the northern waters tend to be transparent, while those found farther south are tinted pink. The broad stomach gives rise to 80–100 non-branching radial canals. Tentacles are slightly more numerous than radial canals and do possess elongated conical bulbs.

References

Aequoreidae
Hydrozoan genera

Taxa named by Louis Agassiz
Monotypic cnidarian genera